The National Flag Decoration  , is one of the highest decorations to be given in Albania, among the Civil awards and decorations of Albania, and was instituted by special law Nr.8113, of 28 March 1996.

This award is granted to Albanians or foreigners for extraordinary contributions for the sublimation of the Albanian nation and Albania.

Mostly the proposer of this Order is the President of the Republic through his own initiative. It could also be the Speaker of Assembly or the Prime Minister.

Famous recipients of National Flag Order

Recipients:

 2006 -  - First President of the partially recognised Republic of Kosova Ibrahim Rugova
 2007 -  - 43rd President of the United States George W. Bush
 2012 -  - Founders of the Kosovo Liberation Army, National Hero of Kosovo Adem Jashari
 2012 -  - Kosovo Albanian activist Adem Demaçi 
 2012 -  - 67th United States Secretary of State Hillary Clinton
 2012 -  - Leader of Albania from 1925 to 1939 Zog I of Albania (posthumous)
 2014 -  - Austrian politician Heinz Fischer
 2015 -  - Portuguese politician who was the 11th President of the European Commission José Manuel Barroso
 2015 -  - 79th Prince and Grand Master of the Sovereign Military Order of Malta Matthew Festing
 2015 -  - Former ruling Emir of the State of Qatar Hamad bin Khalifa Al Thani
 2015 -  - Former Prime Minister of the Republic of Turkey Recep Tayyip Erdoğan
 2015 -  - Former President and Prime Minister of Albania Sali Berisha
 2016 -  -  Albanian novelist and poet Ismail Kadare
2016 -  - Milo Đukanović
2016 -  - Martti Ahtisaari
 2017 -  - former United States senator Bob Dole
 2017 -  - Shaban Polluzha
 2017 -  - Franz Josef Strauss
 2018 -  - Kolinda Grabar-Kitarović
 2018 -  - Albert II, Prince of Monaco
 2018 -  - Stjepan Mesić
 2019 -  - Mujo Ulqinaku

See also
Orders, decorations and medals of Albania

References

Civil awards and decorations
Decoration
Awards established in 1996
1996 establishments in Albania